Zieria distans is a plant in the citrus family Rutaceae and is only found on a few isolated mountains in Queensland. It is a straggly shrub with wiry branches, warty, three-part leaves and clusters of up to about twenty small white flowers, each with four petals and four stamens, in the leaf axils.

Description
The upper surface of the leaflets and the raised midvein on the lower surface are warty due to the presence of glands.

Taxonomy and naming
Zieria distans was first formally described in 2007 by Marco Duretto and Paul Forster from a specimen collected in the Walla Range near Coalstoun Lakes in Queensland. The description was published in Austrobaileya. The specific epithet (distans) is a Latin word meaning "being apart" or "well separated" and refers to the location of this species on well separated mountain tops and ridges.

Distribution and habitat
This zieria grows in rocky places on mountain tops and ridges in woodland and shrubland in the South East Queensland biogeographic region. There are disjunct populations on the Walla Range, Coongara Rock, Kroombit Tops, Westwood Range and Mount Roberts.

Conservation
Zieria distans is listed as "least concern" under the Queensland Nature Conservation Act 1992.

References

distans
Sapindales of Australia
Flora of Queensland
Taxa named by Marco Duretto
Plants described in 2007
Taxa named by Paul Irwin Forster